A tendon sheath is a layer of synovial membrane around a tendon. It permits the tendon to stretch and not adhere to the surrounding fascia.

It has two layers: 
 synovial sheath
 fibrous tendon sheath

Fibroma of the tendon sheath has been described.

References

Musculoskeletal system